Tylacoch Halt railway station served the village of Ynyswen, in the historic county of Glamorgan, Wales, from 1906 to 1912 on the Taff Vale Railway.

History
The station was opened in October 1906 by the Taff Vale Railway. It was a short-lived station, only being open for six years before closing in November 1912.  opened on the site in 1986.

References

Disused railway stations in Rhondda Cynon Taf
Railway stations in Great Britain opened in 1906
Railway stations in Great Britain closed in 1912
1906 establishments in Wales
1912 disestablishments in Wales